Drug testing may refer to:
 Clinical trial
 Drug test
 Drug Testing and Analysis (journal)
 Equine drug testing
 Drug reaction testing
 Drug checking
 Drug Testing (The Office)
 Drug testing reagents (category)